Kamal Dasgupta (28 July 1912 – 20 July 1974), also known as Kamal Uddin Ahamed was a Bangla music director, composer and folk artist. Rāga and Thumri were the main elements of his music. His wife Feroza Begum was a noted Nazrul Sangeet singer. Their second and third sons Hamin Ahmed and Shafin Ahmed are the lead singers with Bangladeshi Band Miles. Thwle following is the complete list of films he scored:

1930s

1940s

1950s

1960s

Non-film Albums

References

Discographies of Bangladeshi artists
Discographies of Indian artists